Health Level Seven International  (HL7) is a non-profit ANSI-accredited standards development organization that develops standards that provide for global health data interoperability.

The 2.x versions of the standards are the most commonly used in the world.

Organization
The HL7 community is organized in the form of a global organization (Health Level Seven International, Inc.) and country-specific affiliate organizations:
Health Level Seven International, Inc. (HL7) is headquartered in Ann Arbor, Michigan.
HL7 has members from over 50 countries, including 500+ corporate members representing healthcare providers, government stakeholders, payers, pharmaceutical companies, vendors/suppliers, and consulting firms.
HL7 affiliate organizations, not-for-profit organizations incorporated in local jurisdictions, exist in over 30 countries. The first affiliate organization was created in Germany in 1993.
Strategic goals and initiatives are presented in HL7's Strategic Plan.

The organizational structure of HL7 is as follows:

The organization is managed by a Board of Directors, which comprises 10 elected positions and three appointed positions.
The Chief Executive Officer (currently Charles Jaffe, MD, PhD) serves as an ex officio member of and reports to the Board of Directors. The Chief Technology Officer (currently Wayne Kubick); and the Chief Operations Officer (currently Mark McDougall) report to the CEO and also serve as ex officio members on the Board of Directors.
The organization consists of more than 40 work groups that are responsible for defining the HL7 standard protocols.
 Each work group is chaired by two or more co-chairs and is organized into four functional groups called steering divisions. 
 Each steering division elects two representatives to serve on the Technical Steering Committee (TSC), which votes on technical issues related to standards.
 TSC also includes two representatives from HL7 affiliates and an Architectural Review Board representative.

Origin
HL7 was founded in 1987 to produce a standard for the exchange of data with hospital information systems. Donald W. Simborg, the CEO of Simborg Systems took the initiative to create the HL7 organization with the aim to allow for wider use of its own exchange protocol (known as the StatLAN protocol, originally defined at the University of California, San Francisco in the late 1970s). Membership initially consisted of those that had already implemented the StatLAN protocol. The name "Health Level-7" is a reference to the seventh layer of the ISO OSI Reference model also known as the application layer. The name indicates that HL7 focuses on application layer protocols for the health care domain, independent of lower layers. HL7 effectively considers all lower layers merely as tools.

HL7 is one of several American National Standards Institute (ANSI) accredited Standards Developing Organizations (SDOs) operating in the healthcare arena. Most of these SDOs produce standards (sometimes called specifications or protocols) for a particular healthcare domain such as pharmacy, medical devices, imaging or insurance (claims processing) transactions. Health Level Seven’s domain is clinical and administrative data.

Collaboration and initiatives
HL7 collaborates with other standards development organizations and national and international sanctioning bodies (e.g. ANSI and ISO), in both the healthcare and information infrastructure domains to promote the use of supportive and compatible standards. HL7 collaborates with healthcare information technology users to ensure that HL7 standards meet real-world requirements, and that appropriate standards development efforts are initiated by HL7 to meet emergent requirements.

HL7 has been adopted by ISO as a center of gravity in international standardization and has been accredited as a partnering organization for mutual issuing of standards. The first mutually published standard is ISO/HL7 21731:2006 Health informatics—HL7 version 3—Reference information model—Release 1.

Accelerator Program 
In February 2019, HL7 launched the FHIR Accelerator Program designed to assist implementers across the health care spectrum in the creation of FHIR implementation guides or other informative documents. The program is based on an innovative model piloted by the HL7 Argonaut Project (provider-provider and provider-patient) and the HL7 Da Vinci Project (payer-provider). The service will allow implementation communities to select a range of support solutions based on their own needs and resources, ranging from self-service templates and tools, to contracted project management, SME, and infrastructure service.

Argonaut Project 
In 2014, HL7 launched the Argonaut Project along with members of the private sector to advance industry adoption of modern, open interoperability standards such as HL7 FHIR. This effort follows on recommendations from the Joint HIT Standards and Policy Committee's JASON Task Force Report, the HIT Standards Committee’s NwHIN Power Team, the MITRE JASON Reports of 2013 and 2014, and the 2010 PCAST Report.

Standards 
HL7 International specifies a number of flexible standards, guidelines, and methodologies by which various healthcare systems can communicate with each other. Such guidelines or data standards are a set of rules that allow information to be shared and processed in a uniform and consistent manner. These data standards are meant to allow healthcare organizations to easily share clinical information. Theoretically, this ability to exchange information should help to minimize the tendency for medical care to be geographically isolated and highly variable.

HL7 International considers the following standards to be its primary standards – those standards that are most commonly used and implemented:

Version 2.x Messaging Standard – an interoperability specification for health and medical transactions
Version 3 Messaging Standard – an interoperability specification for health and medical transactions
 Clinical Document Architecture (CDA) – an exchange model for clinical documents, based on HL7 Version 3
 Continuity of Care Document (CCD) – a US specification for the exchange of medical summaries, based on CDA.
 Structured Product Labeling (SPL) – the published information that accompanies a medicine, based on HL7 Version 3
 Clinical Context Object Workgroup (CCOW) – an interoperability specification for the visual integration of user applications

Other HL7 standards/methodologies include:

 Fast Healthcare Interoperability Resources (FHIR) – a standard for the exchange of resources
 Arden Syntax – a grammar for representing medical conditions and recommendations as a Medical Logic Module (MLM)
 Claims Attachments – a Standard Healthcare Attachment to augment another healthcare transaction
 Functional Models of Electronic Health Record (EHR) / Personal Health Record (PHR)  systems – a standardized description of health and medical functions sought for or available in such software applications
 GELLO – a standard expression language used for clinical decision support

Processes 
HL7 encompasses the complete life cycle of a standards specification including the development, adoption, market recognition, utilization, and adherence.

In April, 2013, HL7's primary standards and other select products were made available for license at no cost. Most HL7 standards can now be deemed Open Standards.

See also

 CDISC
 DICOM
 Electronic medical record
 eHealth
 European Institute for Health Records (European Union)
 Fast Healthcare Interoperability Resources
 Health Informatics
 Integrating the Healthcare Enterprise (IHE)
 ISO TC 215
 openEHR Foundation

References

External links
 HL7.org site
 HL7 International is a member of the Joint Initiative on SDO Global Health Informatics Standardization

Standards organizations in the United States
Medical and health organizations based in Michigan
Organizations established in 1987
Health informatics and eHealth associations